Elisabeth Schwarz (born 5 July 1984) is an Austrian operatic soprano. She was born in Salzburg, Austria.

External links
  

1984 births
Living people
Austrian operatic sopranos
Musicians from Salzburg
21st-century Austrian  women opera singers
University of Music and Performing Arts Graz alumni